Aloisie Krongeigerová (born 1900, date of death unknown) was a Czech diver. She competed in the women's 3 metre springboard event at the 1924 Summer Olympics.

References

External links
 

1900 births
Year of death missing
Czech female divers
Olympic divers of Czechoslovakia
Divers at the 1924 Summer Olympics
Place of birth missing